{{Infobox awards list
| name            = BTS 
| image           = BTS on the Billboard Music Awards red carpet, 1 May 2019.jpg
| image_upright   = 1.4
| alt             = Seven members of BTS pose for a photo in front of a pink wall
| caption         = BTS at the 2019 Billboard Music Awards
| wins            = 510
| nominations     = 723
| hide_awards_box = yes
| awards          =

{{Custom award|[[Variety's Hitmakers|Variety'''s Hitmakers]]|2|2}}

}}
BTS is a South Korean septet formed under record label Big Hit Entertainment, comprising three rappers (RM, Suga, and J-Hope) and four vocalists (Jin, Jimin, V, and Jungkook). The group's debut single album 2 Cool 4 Skool (2013) and subsequent extended play (EP) O!RUL8,2? (2013), despite achieving little commercial success, garnered them several new artist awards during late 2013 and early 2014. They released their second EP Skool Luv Affair (2014) and first studio album Dark & Wild (2014) the following year, to a quieter awards reception; Skool Luv Affair's lead single, "Boy in Luv", received a nomination for Best Dance Performance (Male) at the 2014 Mnet Asian Music Awards, while Dark & Wild won a Disc Bonsang at the 2015 Golden Disc Awards. BTS' third EP The Most Beautiful Moment in Life, Pt. 1 (2015), won the Disc Bonsang at the 2016 Golden Disc Awards, while its lead single "I Need U" received the Best Male Dance award at the 2015 Melon Music Awards. The group's follow up EP, The Most Beautiful Moment in Life, Pt. 2 (2015), received an Album of the Year nomination at the 2016 Gaon Chart Music Awards, for the fourth quarter. BTS' first Korean compilation album The Most Beautiful Moment in Life: Young Forever (2016) earned BTS their first Daesang award for Album of the Year at the 2016 Melon Music Awards and Artist of the Year at the 2016 Mnet Asian Music Awards. The album's second single, "Fire", received a Best Dance – Male nomination at the 2016 Melon Music Awards.

Their second studio album Wings (2016) won Album of the Year at the 26th Seoul Music Awards and Album of the Year – 4th Quarter at the 2017 Gaon Chart Music Awards. The album's lead single, "Blood Sweat & Tears", received a nomination for Song of the Year at the 2016 Mnet Asian Music Awards. "Spring Day", a single taken from BTS' Wings reissue You Never Walk Alone (2017), won the group their first major Song of the Year award at the 9th Melon Music Awards. Their fifth EP Love Yourself: Her (2017) and single "DNA" earned BTS the Musician of the Year title at the 15th Korean Music Awards, while the EP itself received a Disc Daesang at the 32nd Golden Disc Awards and Album of the Year – 3rd Quarter at the 2018 Gaon Chart Music Awards. BTS' third Korean studio album Love Yourself: Tear (2018) won Album of the Year at both the 2018 Melon Music Awards and the 2018 Mnet Asian Music Awards. The album's lead single "Fake Love" won both Song of the Year and Best Pop Song at the 16th Korean Music Awards. Their second Korean compilation album Love Yourself: Answer (2018) garnered BTS their third Artist of the Year at the 2018 Mnet Asian Music Awards and a Disc Daesang at the 33rd Golden Disc Awards. At the 2019 Melon Music Awards, BTS became the first group to win all Daesangs at a year-end award show with their sixth EP Map of the Soul: Persona and lead single "Boy with Luv" (2019). They also won all four Daesangs at the 2019 Mnet Asian Music Awards, making them the artist with the most Daesang wins in Mnet Asian Music Awards history, and overall. The following year, BTS further extended this record when they again won all Daesangs at both the 2020 Melon Music Awards and the 2020 Mnet Asian Music Awards. As of December 2021, they have won 63 Daesangs and remain the most-awarded artist in South Korean history.

BTS have attained 26 Guinness World Records'', including for the most Twitter engagements and for the most viewed video/music video on YouTube in 24 hours, achieving the latter every year since 2018 and most recently with "Butter". The group was inducted into the record body's Hall of Fame in 2022, after claiming 13 world records in 2021 alone. They have consecutively won the Billboard Music Award for Top Social Artist since 2017; are the only K-pop group to win Top Duo/Group, at the 2019 Billboard Music Awards; and are the most-awarded group in BBMA history as of 2022, with 12 wins overall. They are also the only K-pop group to win Favorite Duo or Group – Pop/Rock and Favorite Social Artist at the American Music Awards, and in 2021, became the first Asian act in the show's history to win Artist of the Year. They are the first Korean pop act to receive a Grammy Award nomination, and the first Korean artist to be nominated for a Brit Award. With 30 awards overall, including a record four consecutive wins for Artist of the Year (Asia), BTS are the most-awarded foreign artist in the history of the Japan Gold Disc Awards. They are the only foreign artist to achieve as many consecutive wins in the aforementioned category and to receive as many awards in a single ceremony (2022). They have also placed on the Time 100, in 2019, and are the youngest recipients of the South Korean Order of Cultural Merit. In July 2021, South Korean President Moon Jae-in appointed them Special Presidential Envoy for public diplomacy.

Awards and nominations

Other accolades

State and cultural honors

Listicles

World records

See also
 List of awards and nominations received by RM (rapper)
 List of awards and nominations received by Kim Seok-jin
 List of awards and nominations received by Suga
 List of awards and nominations received by J-Hope
 List of awards and nominations received by Jimin
 List of awards and nominations received by V
 List of awards and nominations received by Jungkook

Notes

References

Awards
BTS